Xylophanes mossi is a moth of the  family Sphingidae. It is known from Brazil.

It is similar to Xylophanes rufescens, but the forewing upperside is uniform rust-brown and all other pattern elements are reduced or absent.

Adults are probably on wing year-round.

The larvae probably feed on Rubiaceae and Malvaceae species.

References

mossi
Moths described in 1917
Endemic fauna of Brazil
Moths of South America